Olivier Greif (3 January 1950, Paris – 13 May 2000, Paris) was a French composer of Polish-Jewish parentage. His father was an Auschwitz survivor, which led Greif to compose a number of Holocaust-themed works, including Todesfuge and Lettres de Westerbork, a song cycle which uses letters written by Etty Hillesum.

Greif began composing at the age of 9 and studied at the Paris Conservatoire and the Juilliard School. He is best known for his solo piano music and songs for voice. He left over 360 works completed at his death, along with several still in progress.

His career was spent teaching composition and directing music festivals such as the Académie-Festival des Arcs.

Works
Greif's music is rooted in the late twentieth century tonal styles of Benjamin Britten and Dmitri Shostakovich with a strong element of folk music, as well as a gestural affinity for Franz Liszt. There is often a dark colouration to the sound, with a favoring of minor modes even in the context of works with a major pull to their tonality. His 23 sonatas for the piano have not been recorded as a complete cycle, and many of his works have been played only once.

His works include the Sonate de Requiem for cello and piano, a cello concerto entitled Durch Adams Fall, four string quartets, the Petite Messe Noire, the chamber opera Nô, and a set of 23 études for piano.

External links
Biographical information for Olivier Greif

1950 births
2000 deaths
French classical composers
French male classical composers
20th-century classical composers
French people of Polish-Jewish descent
Conservatoire de Paris alumni
Juilliard School alumni
Musicians from Paris
20th-century French composers
Burials at Montparnasse Cemetery
20th-century French male musicians